William Stanger may refer to:
 William Stanger (footballer) (born 1985), French footballer
 William Stanger (surveyor), surveyor-general in South Africa